Siddhant Shirodkar (born 22 January 2001) is an Indian professional footballer who plays as a forward for East Bengal in the Indian Super League.

Statistics

References

External links 
 ISL profile
 

2001 births
Living people
Indian footballers
Association football forwards
East Bengal Club players